is a Japanese actress. She won the award for best actress at the 18th Yokohama Film Festival for Haru and the best actress award at the 2010 Montreal World Film Festival for her performance in Villain. She also received acclaim for her role in the Japanese TV series Bayside Shakedown and the subsequent spin-off films of the series. In 1988, she starred in "Christmas Express" commercials for the Central Japan Railway Company.

Early life
Eri Fukatsu was born in Ōita, Ōita, Japan. Her father is an engineer and her mother is the calligrapher Yumiko Fukatsu. She made her show business debut at age 13, winning the Miss Harajuku Grand Prix held in Tokyo's Harajuku neighborhood.

Career
In her early years in Japan's entertainment business, Eri Fukatsu worked as a singer under the names Rie Mizuhara and Rie Takahara, but later decided to use her real name. In 1988 she made her screen debut in the film adaptation of Tōma no Shinzō, entitled Summer Vacation 1999. Among her television credits, Eri Fukatsu also provides narration for the long-running "World Heritage Sites" program on Japanese television.

In 1997, Fukatsu took the role of Sumire Onda in the Bayside Shakedown television series. She co-starred with Satoshi Tsumabuki in Lee Sang-il's 2010 film Villain, for which she won the Best Actress award at the 34th Montreal World Film Festival. In 2011, she starred in Kōki Mitani's A Ghost of a Chance.

Filmography

Films

Television

Discography
Albums
Applause (1990)
Sourire (1992)
Dokuichigo (2012) (as Ichigo Ichie)

Singles
 "Yokohama Joke" (1988)
 "Nanatsu no Namida" (1989)
 "Approach" (1989)
 "Hitori-zutsu no Futari" (1992)
 "Ai wa Suteki, Ai wa Hanataba" (1992)

Photobooks
 Sobacasu (1989)

Awards

References

External links

  - Amuse, Inc.
 
 

1973 births
Living people
Japanese idols
People from Ōita (city)
Actors from Ōita Prefecture
20th-century Japanese actresses
21st-century Japanese actresses
Amuse Inc. talents
Horikoshi High School alumni
Asadora lead actors